Saint-Malo is a historic French port in Ille-et-Vilaine, Brittany, on the English Channel coast.

The walled city had a long history of piracy, earning much wealth from local extortion and overseas adventures. In 1944, the Allies heavily bombed Saint-Malo. The city changed into a popular tourist centre, with a ferry terminal serving the Channel Islands of Jersey and Guernsey, as well as the Southern English settlements of Portsmouth, Hampshire and Poole, Dorset.

The famous transatlantic single-handed yacht race Route du Rhum, which takes place every four years in November, is between Saint Malo and Pointe-à-Pitre in Guadeloupe.

Population
The population in 2017 was 46,097 – though this can increase to up to 300,000 in the summer tourist season. With the suburbs included, the metropolitan area's population is approximately 133,000 (2017).

The population of the commune more than doubled in 1967 with the merging of three communes: Saint-Malo, Saint-Servan (population 14,963 in 1962) and Paramé (population 8,811 in 1962).

Inhabitants of Saint-Malo are called Malouins in French. The population data in the table and graph below refer to the commune of Saint-Malo proper in its geography for the given years.

History

Founded by Gauls in the 1st century BC, the ancient town on the site of Saint-Malo was known as the Roman Reginca or Aletum. By the late 4th century AD, the Saint-Servan district was the site of a major Saxon Shore promontory fort that protected the Rance estuary from seaborne raiders from beyond the frontiers. According to the Notitia Dignitatum, the fort was garrisoned by the militum Martensium under a dux (commander) of the Tractus Armoricanus and Nervicanus section of the litus Saxonicum. During the decline of the Western Roman Empire, Armorica (modern-day Brittany) rebelled from Roman rule under the Bagaudae and in the 5th and 6th centuries received many Celtic Britons fleeing instability across the Channel. The modern Saint-Malo traces its origins to a monastic settlement founded by Saint Aaron and Saint Brendan early in the sixth century. Its name is derived from a man said to have been a follower of Brendan the Navigator, Saint Malo or Maclou, an immigrant from what is now Wales.

Saint-Malo is the setting of Marie de France's poem "Laüstic," a 12th-century love story. The city had a tradition of asserting its autonomy in dealings with the French authorities and even with the local Breton authorities. From 1590 to 1593, Saint-Malo declared itself to be an independent republic, taking the motto "not French, not Breton, but Malouin."

Saint-Malo became notorious as the home of the corsairs, French privateers and sometimes pirates. In the 19th century, this "piratical" notoriety was portrayed in Jean Richepin's play Le flibustier and in César Cui's eponymous opera. The corsairs of Saint-Malo not only forced English ships passing up the Channel to pay tribute but also brought wealth from further afield. Jacques Cartier lived in, and sailed from, Saint-Malo to the Saint Lawrence River, visiting the villages of Stadacona and Hochelaga that would later become the sites of present-day Quebec City and Montreal respectively. As the first European to encounter these sites and learning the local word "Kanata" (meaning a group of houses), Cartier is credited as the discoverer of Canada.

Inhabitants of Saint-Malo are called Malouins in French. From this came the Spanish name for the Islas Malvinas, the archipelago known in English as the Falkland Islands. Islas Malvinas derives from the 1764 name Îles Malouines, given to the islands by French explorer Louis-Antoine de Bougainville. Bougainville, who founded the archipelago's first settlement, named the islands after the inhabitants of Saint-Malo, the point of departure for his ships and colonists.

In 1758, the Raid on Saint-Malo saw a British expedition land, intending to capture the town. However, the British made no attempt on Saint-Malo and instead occupied the nearby town of Saint-Servan, where they destroyed 30 privateers before departing.

World War II

In World War II, during fighting in late August and early September 1944, the historic walled city of Saint-Malo was almost totally destroyed by American shelling and bombing. The beaches of nearby Dinard had been heavily fortified against possible Allied commando raids. Artillery at the two locations provided mutual support.  The fortification complex was garrisoned by more than twelve thousand German troops from different services and units as well as stragglers from other battles in the Cotentin. About eight thousand Germans were in Saint-Malo itself when the battle began.

Colonel Andreas von Aulock, the German commander, refused to surrender when asked to do so by the town's authorities. He said he "would defend St. Malo to the last man even if the last man had to be himself".

The first American attack was launched by the 83rd Infantry Division on 5 August 1944. German positions at Châteauneuf quickly fell. Cancale was abandoned and occupied by the Americans on the 6th. In the same way and on the same day, Dinan fell to Free French forces. The Germans shortened their lines and drew closer to the ancient citadel at St. Servan-sur-Mer, now reinforced with concrete.

Effective German artillery emplacements on the island of Cezembre were out of reach of American ground forces. German garrisons on the Channel Islands of Jersey, Guernsey, and Alderney were able to use small craft to bring in water and remove the wounded from the battle.

On 13 August, the walled city was on fire and a short truce was declared to allow French civilians to flee the city. Outlying German positions at St. Ideuc and La Varde fell to infantry attacks. This fighting ended resistance on the north shore of the peninsula. Only the citadel remained. Surrounded by American artillery and under frequent air attack, this last holdout surrendered on the afternoon of 17 August.

Cezembre surrendered on 2 September when the three-hundred-man garrison ran out of drinking water. The Americans had taken more than ten thousand prisoners during the two-week fight, von Aulock among them.

Post war

Saint-Malo was rebuilt over a 12-year period from 1948 to 1960.

Saint-Malo is a subprefecture of the Ille-et-Vilaine. The commune of Saint-Servan was merged with Paramé, and became the commune of Saint-Malo in 1967.

Saint-Malo was the site of an Anglo-French summit in 1998 that led to a significant agreement regarding European defence policy.

Climate 
The bay of Saint-Malo has an oceanic temperate climate. Temperatures are softened by the Gulf Stream and the range of average temperatures between winter and summer is very low (from 6.1°C in January to 17.8°C in August) with an average temperature of 11.6°C.

Politics 
Saint-Malo is part of Ille-et-Vilaine's 7th constituency, and is currently represented in the National Assembly by Republicans Member of Parliament, Gilles Lurton.

Education

Schools 
Schools include:
13 public preschools (écoles maternelles)
11 public elementary schools
8 private preschools and elementary schools
4 public collège : Chateaubriand, Duguay-Trouin, and Charcot
3 private junior high schools: Choisy Jeanne d'Arc, Moka, and Sacré-Cœur
3 public senior high schools: Lycee Maupertuis, Lycee Jacques Cartier, Professional Maritime Lycee Les Rimains
2 private senior high schools: Lycee Institution Saint Malo-La Providence and Les Rimains

Higher education 
Institute of Technology of Saint-Malo
A nurse school
A maritime school

Transport
Saint-Malo has a terminal for ferry services with daily departures to Portsmouth operated by Brittany Ferries and services on most days Poole in England via the Channel Islands operated by Condor Ferries. It also has a railway station, Gare de Saint-Malo, offering direct TGV service to Rennes, Paris and several regional destinations. There is a bus service provided by Keolis.

Sites of interest

Now inseparably attached to the mainland, Saint-Malo is the most visited place in Brittany. Sites of interest include:

The walled city (La Ville Intra-Muros)
The château of Saint-Malo, part of which is now the town museum.
The Solidor Tower in Saint-Servan is a 14th-century building that holds a collection tracing the history of voyages around Cape Horn. Many scale models, nautical instruments and objects made by the sailors during their crossing or brought back from foreign ports invoke thoughts of travel aboard extraordinary tall ships at the end of the 19th and the beginning of the 20th century.
The tomb of the writer Chateaubriand on the Ile du Grand Bé
The Petit Bé
The Cathedral of St. Vincent (Saint-Malo Cathedral)
The Privateer's House ("La Demeure de Corsaire"), a ship-owner's town house built in 1725, shows objects from the history of privateering, weaponry and ship models.
 The Great Aquarium Saint-Malo, one of the major aquaria in France.
 The labyrinthe du Corsaire, (an attraction park in Saint Malo)
 The Pointe de la Varde, Natural Park.
 The City of Alet, in front of Saint Malo Intra Muros.
 Fort National
 Fort de la Conchée

Panoramic photographs

Notable people

Saint-Malo was the birthplace of:
 Jacques Cartier (1491–1557), explorer of Canada
 Jacques Gouin de Beauchene (1652–1730), explorer of the Falkland Islands
 René Duguay-Trouin (1673–1736) French corsair and Admiral who captured the city of Rio de Janeiro in 1711
 Pierre Louis Moreau de Maupertuis (1698–1759), mathematician and astronomer
 Bertrand-François Mahé de La Bourdonnais (1699–1753), sailor and administrator
 Julien Offray de La Mettrie (1709–1751), physician and philosopher
 Marc-Joseph Marion du Fresne (1724–1772), explorer
 Joseph Quesnel (1746–1809), Canadian poet, composer and playwright
 Louis de Grandpré (1761–1846) French Navy officer and slave trader
 François-René de Chateaubriand (1768–1848), writer and diplomat
 Robert Surcouf (1773–1827), sailor, trader, ship-owner and corsair
 Hughes Felicité Robert de Lamennais (1782–1854), priest, philosophical and political writer
 Jean-Marie Duhamel (1797–1872), mathematician and physicist
 Louis Duchesne (1843–1922), historian, French academician
 Alfred Blunt (1879–1957), Anglican Bishop of Bradford, England, was born at St Malo of British expatriate parents and brought up there until the family returned to England in 1887.
 Pierre Allory - Rev Brother Maurice (1884–1988) of the Brothers of Christian Instruction, teacher and highly decorated during WWI in Medical Corp. 
 Philippe Cattiau (1892–1962), Olympic medalist in fencing
 Colin Clive (1900–1937), actor
 Jean Lebrun (born 1950), journalist and radio producer
 Agnès Martin-Lugand (born 1979), best-seller novelist
 Franck Mailleux (born 1985), racing driver

Twin towns – sister cities

Saint-Malo is twinned with:

 Port-Louis, Mauritius (1999)
 Gaspé, Quebec (2009)
 Saint-Malo, Quebec
 St. Malo, Manitoba
 Cowes, Isle of Wight, United Kingdom
 Gniezno, Poland

Gallery

See also

 Battle for Brest
 Jean-Marie Valentin
 Mont Saint-Michel
 Robert Surcouf
 Rothéneuf
 Shipwrecks of Saint Malo

References

External links

 Town hall's website 
 
 Public transport of Saint-Malo 
 Saint-Malo France Independent travel guide to the historic city of Saint-Malo. 
Mayors of Ille-et-Vilaine Association 

 
Communes of Ille-et-Vilaine
Subprefectures in France
Port cities and towns on the French Atlantic coast
Seaside resorts in France